East Point is a cape and an unincorporated community located at the easternmost extremity of Prince Edward Island, Canada.  Its geographic coordinates are 46º27'N, 61º58'W.

It is the dividing point for delineating the eastern limits of the Northumberland Strait.  Its shores consist of dramatic high sandstone cliffs.  The Canadian Coast Guard maintains a lighthouse as a navigational aid beacon.

Shipwrecks

Among others, the following ships have been wrecked at East Point:
SS Quebec in 1879.
 in 1882.
 while under tow in 1945.

References

Communities in Kings County, Prince Edward Island
Headlands of Prince Edward Island